Scott Treleaven is a Canadian artist whose work employs a variety of media including collage, film, video, drawing, photography and installation.

Artwork
Critical writings have invoked references to Jean Genet, William S. Burroughs, Jack Pierson and Nan Goldin, in describing Treleaven's place in "a lineage of obdurate misfits". He attended the Etobicoke School of the Arts and OCAD University. Treleaven has exhibited in a number of institutions throughout the world including Cooper Cole, Toronto; XYZ Collective, Tokyo; MOCA Tucson, Arizona; Invisible-Exports, New York; The Suburban, Milwaukee; 80WSE, New York; ICA, Philadelphia; Palais de Tokyo, Paris; ICA London, UK; La Biennale de Montréal; and John Connelly Presents, New York. In 2014 Treleaven's drawings were included in the final segment of 'Outside the Lines' at the Contemporary Arts Museum Houston, a major survey of contemporary abstraction.

Films

Treleaven's first film Queercore: A Punk-u-mentary was produced in 1996, a documentary on the queercore scene in the 1990s.

In 2002 Treleaven presented an overview of his independent publishing experiences in a film entitled The Salivation Army which has been screened at MOMA and Art Basel, Switzerland.

In 2005 photographer/director Carter Smith approached Treleaven about adapting his published horror story, Bugcrush, into Smith's Sundance Film Festival award-winning short film. Director Steven Spielberg has openly lauded the film.

In 2008, he appeared in the feature film, The Lollipop Generation by G.B. Jones, alongside Jena von Brücker, Mark Ewert, Vaginal Davis, Calvin Johnson and Joel Gibb.

In March 2011, The Museum of Modern Art in New York (MOMA) featured a program of Treleaven's films as part of the Queer Cinema from the Collection: Today and Yesterday program, curated by artist AA Bronson and Joshua Siegel, Associate Curator, Department of Film, at The Museum of Modern Art.

Publications and Zines

Concurrent with the documentary Queercore: A Punk-u-mentary, Treleaven created an illustrated zine project called This Is The Salivation Army (1996–1999): a mix of  punk, goth, occult, and industrial music aesthetics, alongside homages to iconoclasts like William S. Burroughs, Brion Gysin, William Blake, and Derek Jarman. The zine was a seeding ground for a variety of concepts and styles that would continue to appear in Treleaven's visual art. Books, zines and independently produced publications continue to be a recurring motif throughout his work.

In 2006 a book marking the 10th anniversary of the This Is The Salivation Army project was published by Printed Matter (NY) and Art Metropole (Toronto), containing an entire reprint of the zines alongside more recent drawings and collages.

Treleaven's contribution to artist publications has been acknowledged in the books, In Numbers: Serial Publications by Artists Since 1955  (JRP|Ringier 2009), The Magazine – Documents of Contemporary Art Series (MIT Press 2015) and Showboat: Punk, Sex, Bodies (Dashwood 2016).

Filmography 
 Last 7 Words (2009), actors: Genesis P-Orridge, soundtrack by Locrian (Terence Hannum & André Foisy)
 Silver (2006), actors: AA Bronson, soundtrack by Andrew Zealley
 Gold (2006), actors: Genesis P-Orridge and Lady Jaye Breyer P-Orridge, soundtrack by Andrew Zealley
 Bugcrush (2006), original story. Written and directed by Carter Smith
 The Salivation Army (2002), actors: Kevin Drew
 Beastboy (2002), actor: Andrew Cecil
 He Is the Boss Of Me (2001), video for The Hidden Cameras
 Queercore: A punk-u-mentary (1996)

Bibliography 
 The Age of Collage Vol. 3: Contemporary Collage in Modern Art, gestalten, Berlin, 2020
 Showboat: Punk / Sex / Bodies, Dashwood Books, New York, 2016
 The Two Eyes Are Not Brothers, by Scott Treleaven, published by Kiddiepunk, Paris, 2011
 Passing Strange, by Scott Treleaven, published by Viafarini, Milan, 2009
 Collage: Assembling Contemporary Art, Black Dog Publishing, 2008, 
 Queer Zines, Printed Matter Inc., 2008, 
 Grey Book (catalogue), by Scott Treleaven, published by The Breeder gallery, Athens, 2008
 Some Boys Wander By Mistake (catalogue), by Scott Treleaven, with texts by Dennis Cooper, Terence Hannum, and Jack Pierson, co-published by Kavi Gupta Gallery, John Connelly Presents & Marc Selwyn Fine Art, 2007, 
 Juicy Mother: How They Met, edited by Jennifer Camper, Manic D Press, 2007, 
 An Emerald Tablet, by Scott Treleaven, Friends of the High Line, NY, 2007
 The Salivation Army Black Book, by Scott Treleaven, Printed Matter Inc./Art Metropole, 2006, 
 Generation Hex (The Disinformation Company book)|Generation Hex, edited by Jason Louv, The Disinformation Company, 2005, 
 Queer Fear II, Michael Rowe, editor, Arsenal Pulp Press, 2002,  (horror fiction collection featuring Treleaven's infamous short story 'Bugcrush')
 We want some too: Underground desire and the reinvention of mass culture, by Hal Niedzviecki, Penguin Putnam, 2000, 
 This Is The Salivation Army, issues 1–8, by Scott Treleaven, 1996 to 1999
 This Is The Salivation Army, issue 10, by Scott Treleaven, Art Gallery of York University, 2004 ('The Salivation Army' film is considered issue #9; issue 10 was an addition to This Is the Salivation Army zines in name only and not considered part of the original run)

References

External links

Scott Treleaven's artwork at Cooper Cole gallery, Toronto
Scott Treleaven's artwork at Invisible-Exports gallery, New York

Artists from Toronto
Canadian contemporary artists
Queercore
Film directors from Toronto
Year of birth missing (living people)
Living people
Canadian gay artists
Canadian mixed media artists
Canadian video artists